Savio may refer to:

People
 Surname
 Carlos Fernando Savio (born 1978), Uruguayan footballer
 Daniel Savio (born 1978), Swedish musician
 Dominic Savio (1842–1857), Italian saint
  (1899–1945), Italian partisan
 Edit Romanos Cristovão Savio (born 1992), Timorese footballer 
 Gaetano Savio (1937–2004), better known as Totò Savio, Italian composer, lyricist, producer and guitarist
  (born 1948) Italian cycling manager
 John Savio (1902–1938), Saami artist from Norway
 José Carlos dos Anjos Sávio (born 1985), Brazilian footballer
 Kathleen Savio (1963 - 2004), American homicide victim
 Manuel Savio (1893–1948), pioneer of Argentine metallurgy and heavy industry
 María Teresa Linares Savio (1920–2021), Cuban musicologist and ethnographer
 Mario Savio (1942–1996), Free Speech Movement leader at the University of California, Berkeley in the 1960s
 Matheus Gonçalves Sávio (born 1997), Brazilian footballer who plays as an attacking midfielder
 Roberto Savio founder of IPS
 Sami Savio, Finnish politician
 Vincenzo Savio (1944–2004), Italian Roman Catholic Bishop of Belluno-Feltre

Given name
 Sávio Alves Marchiote (born 1996), Brazilian right back
 Sávio Antônio Alves (born 1995), Brazilian left back
 Sávio Bortolini Pimentel (born 1974), commonly known as Sávio, retired Brazilian footballer, of Flamengo and Real Madrid fame
 Savio Kabugo (born 1995), Ugandan footballer
 Savio Medeira (born 1965), Indian footballer and manager
 Sávio Moreira de Oliveira (born 2004), Brazilian forward
 Savio Nsereko (born 1989), German footballer
 Sávio Oliveira do Vale (born 1984), Brazilian footballer
 Sávio Sousa (born 1977), Brazilian footballer
 Savio Tai Fai Hon (born 1950), Hong Kong-born Roman Catholic archbishop
 Savio Vega (born 1964), Puerto Rican professional wrestler

Places
 Savio (river), an Italian river
 Savio (Kerava), city district in Kerava, Finland
 Savio railway station, the railway station located in Savio, Finland 
 Savio, a settlement in Escobar Partido, Argentina
 Savio (Ravenna), a frazione of Ravenna, Italy

Other uses
 Deportes Savio, a Honduran football club
 Savio (office), a high office in the administration of the dogal Republic of Venice